Alhaji Abdulkadir Shehu was acting Administrator of Delta State, Nigeria between November and December 1993 immediately after General Sani Abacha had assumed power from the civilian government.
Shehu was Delta State Commissioner of Police, and filled in after the elected governor had been dismissed until Colonel Bassey Asuquo was appointed administrator.

References

Nigerian military governors of Delta State
Living people
Year of birth missing (living people)